Many L-410s were delivered to the former Soviet Union and ex-Soviet states and stayed there and in Russia, but some have been also sold to airlines in Asia, Africa, Central America, and South America. Forty aircraft are in use throughout Europe for commercial operation or skydiving.

Current civilian operators

 Air Express Algeria

Icar Air

Heli Air Services

Aerocord

Searca

Inter îles Air

Silver Air
Van Air Europe

 Air Guyane Express

Vanilla Sky

Aerolíneas Sosa
CM Airlines

Luwang Air

Susi Air

TransAviaBaltika

Summit Air

Sky Pasada

government agencies and border guard

Kazan Air Enterprise
Khabarovsk Airlines
Komiaviatrans
KrasAvia
Orenburzhye
Petropavlovsk-Kamchatsky Air Enterprise
2nd Arkhangelsk United Aviation Division

Solenta Aviation
Air-Tec Global

Air Excel

Former civilian operators

NHT Linhas Aéreas (BRAVA Linhas Aéreas)
Noar Linhas Aéreas
TEAM Linhas Aéreas

Government of the Czech Republic

 ABA Air
Government of Czechoslovakia
Slov-Air

Trade Air

 Interflug

Tortug' Air

Atlantic Airlines de Honduras

Aviaexpress
Farnair Hungary

Government of Slovenia

Government of Slovakia

Archana Airways

Metavia Airlines

Aeroflot

Air Guyane Express

Rivne Universal Avia)

Private Companies in the Aviation Industries

Current military operators

Bangladesh Air Force currently operates 3 L-410UVP-E20

 Bulgarian Air Force

 Czech Air Force

 Military of Cape Verde

 Djibouti Air Force

 Honduras Air Force

 Lithuanian Air Force

 Russian Air Force

 Slovak Air Force

 Slovenian Air Force and Air Defence

 Tunisian Air Force

Former military operators

 Colombian Air Force
 Satena

Comoros Military Aviation Command

 Czechoslovak Air Force

 Estonian Border Guard Aviation Corps

 East German Air Force

 Luftwaffe

Hungarian Air Force

Latvian Air Force

 Libyan Air Force

 Peruvian Army

 Soviet Air Force

References 

Lists of aircraft operators by aircraft type